Hlevnik is a small village in the Municipality of Brda in the Littoral region of Slovenia, on the border with Italy.

References

External links
Hlevnik on Geopedia

Populated places in the Municipality of Brda